Blackle is an internet search engine powered by Google Programmable Search Engine. Blackle was created by Tony Heap of Heap Media Australia, which aims to save energy by displaying a black background with a grayish-white text color on search results. Blackle claims to have saved over 8.5 MWh of electrical energy as of January 2021.

Concept 
The concept behind Blackle is that computer monitors can be made to use less energy by displaying much darker colors. Blackle is based on a study which tested a variety of CRT and LCD monitors. However, these claims are disputed over whether there are any energy saving effects, especially for users of LCD screens, where there is a constant backlight.

This concept was first brought to the attention of Heap Media by a blog post, which estimated that Google could save 750 megawatt hours a year by utilizing it for CRT screens. The homepage of Blackle provides a count of the number of watt hours claimed to have been saved by enabling this concept.

History 

Blackle launched in January 2007. During this time, Blackle gained popularity and was featured in multiple mainstream media outlets.

Blackle international, which translated Blackle into Portuguese, French, Czech, Italian, and Dutch was retired in 2019. While the International page is still up, every link listed has experienced link rot. As of 2021, the site is only available in English.

See also 
 Light-on-dark color scheme
 Performance per watt

References

External links 
 

Australian websites
Energy conservation
Environmental websites
Web services
Web service providers
Google
Computers and the environment
Internet properties established in 2007